= Kathy DuBose =

Kathy DuBose (née Nalley; born July 17, 1962) is an artist from Easley, South Carolina. She is affiliated with the Artists Guild Gallery of Greenville where her work is available for purchase. Kathy DuBose finds her inspiration from her passion for the outdoors and traveling with her family. She explores such mediums as watercolors, acrylics, and oil paints to create detailed landscapes, street scenes, and wildlife paintings. Kathy DuBose is a graduate of Wofford College (class of '84).

== Personal ==
Kathy DuBose is a mother of three and currently resides in Easley, SC with her husband. Besides painting, she serves as the chair of the special events committee for the Foundation at Baptist Easley Hospital.
